William Arthur Brownell (May 19, 1895 – May 28, 1977) was an American educational psychologist.

Early life 
Brownell was born in Smethport, Pennsylvania on May 19, 1895. He graduated from Allegheny College in 1917. He received a Ph.D. in 1926 from the University of Chicago.

Academic career 
From 1930 to 1949 he was a professor of educational psychology at Duke University where he did his most important research.

From 1950 to his retirement in 1962 he was the Dean of the University of California, Berkeley Graduate School of Education.

In 1965 he received the E. L. Thorndike Award.

Personal life 
He married Kathryn K. (1903-2001) and they had at least one child.

References 

20th-century American psychologists
1895 births
1977 deaths
University of California, Berkeley Graduate School of Education faculty
Duke University faculty
People from Smethport, Pennsylvania